Sir James Carnegie of Kinnaird and of Pitarrow, 5th Baronet DL (1799 – 30 January 1849) was a Scottish politician and de jure 8th Earl of Southesk, 8th Baron Carnegie of Kinnaird and 8th Baron Carnegie of Kinnaird and Leuchars.

Background
Born at Kinnaird, Angus, he was the son of Sir David Carnegie, 4th Baronet and Agnes Murray Elliot, daughter of Andrew Elliot. In 1805 at the age of six, he succeeded his father as baronet. He was educated at home and at Eton College. In 1818, Carnegie began his Grand Tour, first visiting France, Germany and Italy, then Spain and Holland in the following year.

Career
Carnegie entered the British House of Commons in 1830 and sat as Member of Parliament (MP) for Aberdeen Burghs until the following year. He was a Deputy Lieutenant of Forfarshire. In 1847, he petitioned the restoration of the forfeited titles Lord Carnegie and Earl of Southesk, however after assessment by the Committee of Privileges his claim was not followed up.

Family
While again on travels through France and Italy, Carnegie met Charlotte Lysons, second daughter of Reverend Daniel Lysons. They married at the house of the British Ambassador to Italy in Naples on 14 November 1825, and had two daughters and three sons. Carnegie died intestate at Kinnaird Castle, Brechin. His eldest son, James, succeeded to the baronetcy and was later confirmed in his de jure titles. 

His third son, Charles, represented Forfarshire in the Parliament of the United Kingdom. His daughter, Lady Charlotte Elliot (married name), was a published poet.

References

Sources

External links

1799 births
1849 deaths
Baronets in the Baronetage of Nova Scotia
Deputy Lieutenants of Forfarshire
Members of the Parliament of the United Kingdom for Scottish constituencies
People educated at Eton College
UK MPs 1830–1831
Members of the Parliament of the United Kingdom for Aberdeen constituencies